Lilmanaj (also Romanized as Līlmānaj, Laylmānaj, and Lilmanj; also known as Lelmānaj) is a village in Sarab Rural District, in the Central District of Sonqor County, Kermanshah Province, Iran. At the 2006 census, its population was 805, in 178 families.

References 

Populated places in Sonqor County